The 2012 FC Machida Zelvia season saw FC Machida Zelvia compete in J.League Division 2 for the first time after being promoted from the 2011 Japan Football League. Machida Zelvia were relegated back to the Japan Football League on the last day of the season after a 0-3 defeat to Shonan Bellmare. They are also competing in the 2012 Emperor's Cup.

Players
As of March 7, 2012.

Transfers

Winter

In:

Out:

Summer

In:

Out:

Competitions

J. League 2

Matches

League table

Emperor's Cup

Squad statistics

Appearances and goals

|-
|colspan="14"|Players who appeared for Machida Zelvia no longer at the club:
|}

Top scorers

Disciplinary record

References

FC Machida Zelvia
FC Machida Zelvia seasons